The Prostitutes are an indie rock band formed in 2004 in Prague, Czech Republic. The original members were singer Adrian T. Bell, guitarist Martin Destroyer (Martin Přikryl), keyboard player Stevie LFO (Martin Převrátil), bass-guitarist Mark Jukebox (Marek Dziuba) and drummer Luk Santiago (Lukáš Přikryl).
The Prostitutes released their first album "Get Me Out Of Here" in September 2006.
In December 2006, Mark Jukebox left the band after long-term mutual disagreements. New bass-guitarist Šmity (Martin Chmátal) was on board immediately. Šmity is also known in the Czech Republic for his own band called Roe-Deer. In late 2009, Šmity left the band due to his time-consuming employment as a sound engineer. Adam Piaf, former frontman of the band Fake Tapes, became the new bass-guitarist.

History
The pre-history sees Luk Santiago and Martin Destroyer playing in bands like The Night Traffic and Angličáky in 1989-1995. Santiago, LFO and Destroyer played together in another band called The Radios, which disintegrated in 2004. They invited a bass player and a singer and started a new band in November 2004.

In April 2005, the band recorded their first EP with four tracks: Look into My Eyes, She's a Monster, She's a Prostitute and Sunshine. In July, they appeared in the Star Guitar programme of Ocko TV, the biggest music TV station in Czech Republic and Slovakia. Since then, the Ocko TV has been broadcasting their video-clips for Look into My Eyes and She's a Monster. Also in July, the Alternativa programme of Radiozurnal (Czech biggest radio station) presented She's a Monster. NMM named The Prostitutes the best new band. Radio 1 listed the single Sunshine into their broadcasting scheme. On 5 September, the Alternative Programme of Radiournl presented The Prostitutes again, this time with an extensive interview. An article on The Prostitutes was published in the Filter magazine in that same week. iDnes, the biggest Czech news portal, ranked the single She's A Monster 10th in the chart of the "20 most significant tracks of September 2005". She's A Monster was in Hitparade at Ocko for seven weeks beating up popstars such as Madonna, Rammstein or Depeche Mode.

The band was concerting a lot during 2005/2006 including major towns and cities in Czech Republic as well as major festivals like United Islands Of Prague  playing on the same stage as Placebo.

Their debut album was awaited with big expectations and they were, according to huge press response, fulfilled. Get Me Out Of Here was released 4 September 2006 under Championship Records and is distributed by Sony/BMG. Filter magazine gave it 4/5, Music magazine gave it 5/5, Musicserver gave 9/10. NMM gave them 4/5 saying that some of the tracks are the best that came out of Czech Republic in last ten years so far. First single Sunshine hit the charts at Radio Wave dominating at number 1 for six weeks  and Radio Akropolis was in top ten for more than three months. The music video for the single "Sunshine" scored in all Czech major TV charts.

In November 2006 the band toured in Spain, together with a Spanish band called Catpeople. They played in Granada, Cartagena, Jaén and Barcelona. A concert in Valencia was canceled due to technical problems in the venue. Despite the fact that they were in Spain for the very first time, they raised quite big media attention having a music video appearance in MTV Spain, interview and a part of live performance in main Spanish national television, interview and songs broadcasting in a prominent Spanish music show compared to John Peel Session at NRE 3 and also very good Internet coverage at Spanish speaking music servers. They were also invited back to Barcelona in May and August 2007.

In January 2007, The Prostitutes were awarded Band of The Year by the main Czech music magazine Filter, being nominated also for Song of The Year with Sunshine.
They received the award for Music Video Of The Year at prestigious TV Óčko Awards 2006 for the song "Sunshine", being nominated also for The Best Rock Band Of The Year and Best New Act.
In the readers part of Fllter Awards they received prize for the best song of the year with their successful single "Sunshine".
They were nominated for "Czech Grammy" - Anděl Award 2006 for The best new act.

In May 2007 they played support for Mick Harvey in Prague's Lucerna Music Bar.

Discography

SP
Leave Like It Is (2009)

EP
The Prostitutes (2005)

Albums
Get Me Out Of Here (2006)
Hometown Zombies (2009)
ONE TWO THREE FOUR (Live) (2011)
Deaf To The Call (2012)
Zum Passer (2015)

Gear

Martin Destroyer used to play mainly guitars of two brands: Rickenbacker and Fender, being specific Rickenbacker 330 and 360/12 and Fender Telecaster and Fender Telecaster Deluxe reissue. He also plays Gibson SG Classic and ES-335. He used to play Godin Radiator and Epiphone Les Paul. His amplifiers are Hiwatt and Fender. In studio he also uses Radiotron AC-30, a custom made version of Vox AC-30.

Stevie LFO used to play Korg Polysix  and during recording of Sunshine he also played Roland Juno-106. Currently he uses Prophet 08, Clavia Nord Lead 3, Yamaha AN1x and Korg Poly-800.

Luk Santiago plays Ludwig Custom set, Ludwig snare and Sabian and Meinl cymbals.

Šmity play through Hiwatt amplifier and Ampeg cabinet, using Fender Precision, Jazzbass, Gibson Thunderbird and Les Paul bass, Hamer 12-string bass, double-bass and Rickenbacker bass

References and resources

official The Prostitutes site
Martin Destroyer's blog
The Prostitutes myspace profile
Spanish review at PopChild.com
first article about band in czech music magazine Filter - 2005
New Castle The Evening Chronicle article about The Prostitutes
Flickr gallery of The Prostitutes

External links
 official The Prostitutes site
 The Prostitutes myspace profile
 The Prostitutes official blog

Czech indie rock groups
Musical groups established in 2004
Musicians from Prague
2004 establishments in the Czech Republic